Jameel Antwon Cook Sr. (born February 8, 1979) is a former American football fullback who played in the National Football League (NFL). He was drafted by the Tampa Bay Buccaneers in the sixth round of the 2001 NFL Draft, playing nine seasons with the Buccaneers and Houston Texans. He played college football at Illinois.

Cook was a member of the Buccaneers team that won Super Bowl XXXVII.

References

1979 births
Living people
Players of American football from Miami
American football fullbacks
Illinois Fighting Illini football players
Tampa Bay Buccaneers players
Houston Texans players